USS Nodaway (AOG-67), was a type T1  built for the US Navy during World War II. She was named after the Nodaway River, in Iowa. Nodaway (AOG-67) was never commissioned into the US Navy.

Construction
Nodaway was laid down on 22 January 1945, under a Maritime Commission (MARCOM) contract, MC hull 2627, by the St. Johns River Shipbuilding Company, Jacksonville, Florida; acquisition by the US Navy was cancelled on 27 August 1945.

Service history
Completed by Merrill-Stevens Drydock & Repair Co., 18 September 1945, she was renamed West Ranch. She was sold to Sun Oil, in 1946, and renamed Dynafuel. On 14 November 1963, she collided near Buzzards Bay, Massachusetts, with the Norwegian freighter . She was scrapped later in 1963, due to the damage from the collision and fire.

References

Bibliography

External links 
 Auke Visser's Famous T - Tankers Pages

 

Klickitat-class gasoline tankers
Ships built in Jacksonville, Florida
1945 ships